Eustratius or Eustratios, in modern transliteration Efstratios (Greek: Εὐστράτιος/Greek: Ευστράτιος) is a Greek given name. Its diminutive form is Stratos (Greek: Στράτος) or Stratis (Greek: Στρατής or Greek: Στράτης).

Places
 Agios Efstratios, an island in the northern Aegean Sea, Greece

People with the given name
 Eustratios of Constantinople, author of Refutation (after 582)
 Eustratius of Nicaea (c. 1050/1060–c. 1120), bishop of Nicaea
 Eustratius Garidas, patriarch of Constantinople, 1081–1084
 Stratis Myrivilis (Efstratios; 1890–1969), Greek writer (pseudonym)
 Stratos Apostolakis (Efstratios; born 1964), Greek professional football player
 Efstratios Grivas (born 1966), Greek chess grandmaster
 Efstratios Gidopoulos, president of AEK Athens in 1988–1991
 Stratos Perperoglou (Efstratios; born 1984), Greek professional basketball player

See also
 Stratis (disambiguation)
 Saint Eustratius (disambiguation)
 Stratos (disambiguation)

Greek masculine given names